Saleh Ahmed Farhan (born 1 January 1981) is a Bahraini footballer currently playing for Al-Riffa of Bahrain and the Bahrain national football team. He is of Syrian descent.

Career statistics

International

References

External links
 
 

1981 births
Living people
Bahraini footballers
Qatar SC players
Bahraini people of Syrian descent
Qatar Stars League players
Al Hala SC players
Association football midfielders
Bahrain international footballers
2004 AFC Asian Cup players